John Crewes (15 July 1847 – 29 December 1925) was a New Zealand Bible Christian minister, social worker and journalist. He was born in Grampound, Cornwall, England on 15 July 1847.

Early life
Crewes was born in Grampound, Cornwall, in 1847. His parents were Isabella and Richard Crewes. At an early age, he was attracted to preaching in the Bible Christian Church. On 1 September 1877, he married Martha Veale. They arrived in Christchurch, New Zealand, in 1879, two years after the first Bible Christian missionaries had come to Christchurch.

Christian work in New Zealand
In early 1881, Crewes witnessed the laying of a foundation stone for the first Bible Christian church in New Zealand; this was to be built in Christchurch's High Street. At the time the church opened, it was free of debt, which is a sign of Crewes' energy. He stepped back from preaching for some time over health concerns but rejoined in 1888, with particular focus on Addington; the main jail for Christchurch was at that time in that suburb. In 1890, Crewes was transferred to Wellington and settled in Newtown.

Political ambition
Crewes unsuccessfully contested the 1884 election in the Christchurch North electorate against Julius Vogel. At the 1887 election, Crewes contested the Sydenham electorate against Richard Molesworth Taylor. They received 392 and 766 votes respectively, so Taylor entered the 10th New Zealand Parliament.

In the 1902 election, Crewes made a last attempt to enter Parliament.  He contested the Newtown electorate, but withdrew his nomination before polling day.

Death
He died in Wellington on 29 December 1925. His wife had died in Wellington on 1 August 1913. He is buried at Karori Cemetery.

References

1847 births
1925 deaths
New Zealand social workers
New Zealand journalists
English emigrants to New Zealand
British emigrants to New Zealand
New Zealand people of Cornish descent
Unsuccessful candidates in the 1884 New Zealand general election
Unsuccessful candidates in the 1887 New Zealand general election
Burials at Karori Cemetery